Gravity, or gravitation, is the mass-proportionate force of attraction among matter.

Gravity may also refer to:

Arts and entertainment

Film and television
 Gravity (2009 film), a German crime film
 Gravity (2013 film), a British-American science fiction thriller film
 Gravity (TV series), a 2010 American comedy-drama series
 "Gravity" (Star Trek: Voyager), a television episode

Games 
 Gravity (video game), a 1990 action-strategy computer game
 Professor Heinz Wolff's Gravity, a 2008 physics-based video game

Music

Albums 
 Gravity (Alejandro Escovedo album) or the title song, 1992
 Gravity (Anekdoten album) or the title song, 2003
 Gravity (Big & Rich album) or the title song, 2014
 Gravity (Bullet for My Valentine album) or the title song, 2018
 Gravity (Bush Babees album) or the title song, 1996
 Gravity (Crashcarburn album) or the title song, 2012
 Gravity (Fred Frith album), 1980
 Gravity (Gryffin album), 2019
 Gravity (James Brown album) or the title song (see below), 1986
 Gravity (Jesse Cook album) or the title song, 1996
 Gravity (Kenny G album) or the title song, 1985
 Gravity (Lecrae album) or the title song, 2012
 Gravity (Our Lady Peace album), 2002
 Gravity (Out of the Grey album) or the title song, 1995
 Gravity (Westlife album), 2010
 Gravity: Original Motion Picture Soundtrack, from the 2013 film
 Gravity, by D-Side, or the title song, 2005
 Gravity, by Fly to the Sky, 2004
 Gravity, by Praying Mantis, 2018
 Gravity, by Seven Story Drop, 2005
 Gravity, an EP by Against the Current, 2015

Songs 
 "Gravity" (Brent Faiyaz and DJ Dahi song), 2021
 "Gravity" (DJ Fresh song), 2015
 "Gravity" (Embrace song), 2004
 "Gravity" (Hovig song), 2017
 "Gravity" (James Brown song), 1986
 "Gravity" (Jasmine Kara song), 2017
 "Gravity" (John Mayer song), 2006
 "Gravity" (Luna Sea song), 2000
 "Gravity" (Maaya Sakamoto song), 2003
 "Gravity" (Nothing's Carved in Stone song), 2015
 "Gravity" (Papa Roach song), 2015
 "Gravity" (Pixie Lott song), 2010
 "Gravity" (Sara Bareilles song), 2009
 "Gravity" (The Superjesus song), 2000
 "Gravity" (Zlata Ognevich song), 2012
 "Gravity", by ...And You Will Know Us by the Trail of Dead from X: The Godless Void and Other Stories, 2020
 "Gravity", by Aranda from Aranda, 2008
 "Gravity", by Architects from All Our Gods Have Abandoned Us, 2016
 "Gravity", by Audiovent from Dirty Sexy Knights in Paris, 2002
 "Gravity", by Bic Runga from  Beautiful Collision, 2002
 "Gravity", by Blondie from Pollinator, 2017
 "Gravity", by Bone Thugs from New Waves, 2017
 "Gravity", by Coldplay from Talk, 2005
 "Gravity", by Daughtry from Cage to Rattle, 2018
 "Gravity", by Dean Brody from Dean Brody, 2009
 "Gravity", by Delirious? from Mezzamorphis, 1999
 "Gravity", by the Dresden Dolls from The Dresden Dolls, 2003
 "Gravity", by Exo from Don't Mess Up My Tempo, 2018
 "Gravity", by Hollywood Undead from Day of the Dead, 2015
 "Gravity", by Hüsker Dü from Everything Falls Apart, 1983
 "Gravity", by Jamie Woon from Mirrorwriting, 2011
 "Gravity", by Max Webster from High Class in Borrowed Shoes, 1977
 "Gravity", by Michael Sembello from the film Cocoon, 1985
 "Gravity", by No Doubt from Push and Shove, 2012
 "Gravity", by Oh My Girl from The Fifth Season, 2019
 "Gravity", by a Perfect Circle from Thirteenth Step, 2003
 "Gravity", by Raven-Symoné from the film For One Night, 2006
 "Gravity", by Shawn McDonald from Simply Nothing, 2004
 "Gravity", by soulDecision from No One Does It Better, 2000
 "Gravity", by Space from Love You More than Football, 2000
 "Gravity", by Taeyeon from Purpose, 2019
 "Gravity", by Vienna Teng from Waking Hour, 2002
 "Gravity", by the Whitest Boy Alive from Rules, 2009

Other uses in arts and entertainment
 Gravitation (M. C. Escher) or Gravity, a 1952 mixed-media artwork by M. C. Escher
 Gravity (comics), a Marvel Comics superhero
 Gravity, a 1999 novel by Tess Gerritsen

Brands and enterprises 
 Gravity (American company), a content and ad company
 Gravity, British jet suit manufacturer, founded by Richard Browning
 Gravity (Korean company), a South Korean video-game developer
 Gravity Entertainment, an American film and television production company
 Gravity Gaming or Team Gravity, a defunct North American League of Legends team
 Gravity Investments, an American investment services company based in Denver, Colorado
 Gravity Payments, an American payment processor based in Seattle, Washington
 Gravity R&D, a Hungarian IT provider based in Budapest
 Gravity Records, an American record label from San Diego, California
 Gravity Studios, an American recording studio in Chicago, Illinois
 The Gravity Group, an American roller coaster design firm based in Cincinnati, Ohio

Science and engineering 
 Gravity (alcoholic beverage), the concentration of ethanol in an alcoholic beverage
 Gravity (software), a program designed to simulate the motions of planetary bodies
 GRAVITY, an instrument at the Very Large Telescope Interferometer
 API gravity, a measure of how heavy or light a petroleum liquid is compared to water
 Specific gravity or relative density, the ratio of the density of a substance to the density of a reference material

Other uses
 Gravity (Twitter client), a social networking client for Symbian smartphones
 Gravity, Iowa, U.S., a city

See also 

 
 
 Gravidity, in medicine, the number of times a woman has been pregnant
 Gravitas, a quality of substance or depth of personality
 Gravitation (disambiguation)
 Law of Gravity (disambiguation)
 Oh! Gravity., a 2006 album by Switchfoot